Moraby is a locality in the Western Downs Region, Queensland, Australia.

History 
The locality was named and bounded on 25 February 2000.

References 

Western Downs Region
Localities in Queensland